The 2018 USAC P1 Insurance National Midget Championship is the 63rd season of the Midget series sanctioned by USAC. P1 Insurance becomes the new title sponsor of the series for 2018. The season will begin with the Shamrock Classic at Southern Illinois Center on March 10, and will end with the Turkey Night Grand Prix at Ventura Raceway on November 22. The series will also have a non points race with the Junior Knepper 55 at Southern Illinois Center on December 15. Spencer Bayston enters the season as the defending champion.

Team & Driver Chart

Driver & Team Changes 
 - Dooling/Hayward Motorsports formed an alliance with Richard Childress Racing to team up for the 2018 season with entries in USAC's P1 Insurance National Midget Championship & AMSOIL National Sprint Car Championship. Originally it was slated that Brady Bacon would race for the championship in both Midget & Sprint Car series for the team. Tanner Thorson will also race for the team in select races. However, Bacon returned to the FMR Racing team for the 2018 Midget season. Thomas Meseurall raced for the team at DuQuoin and Kokomo. Kevin Thomas Jr. joined the team in May for select Midget & Sprint Car (winged & local non-wing) races.
 - Petry-Goff Motorsports will run 2 full-time teams for the 2018 season. Jerry Coons Jr. will race full-time in the #25 car. Kevin Thomas Jr. & Jason McDougal so far have raced for the team in the #15 car.
 - Leader Card Racers will return to the USAC National Midgets in a one-off entry in the BC39 race at Indianapolis Motor Speedway with Tracy Hines driving for the team.
 - Monster Energy NASCAR Cup Series driver Landon Cassill will race a one-off entry for Brooke Shuman Motorsports in the Bell Racing sponsored #21x at the Driven2SaveLives BC39 at the Indianapolis Motor Speedway
 - Chris Windom will race for Petry-Goff Motorsports in their #35 entry at the Driven2SaveLives BC39 at the Indianapolis Motor Speedway.

Schedule 
The entire season will have on-demand video coverage by Loudpedal.TV. Select races will be broadcast live online by Speed Shift TV. The Cushion will broadcast the race at BAPS. Eldora Speedway will broadcast the Four Crown Nationals on their website. NBCSN will broadcast a recap show of the BC39 at the Indianapolis Motor Speedway on a single-day delay.

 - * will state if the race is a non points event, or a preliminary night.
 - ≠ will state if the race was postponed or canceled

Schedule notes and changes

 - Jason Leffler Memorial will return to Wayne County Speedway in Illinois on October 21. The return of the race was announced on July 15.
 - New venues on the schedule for 2018 include: Indianapolis (IMS Dirt Track), Red Dirt & Sweet Springs.
 - Venues from the 2017 season that aren't returning to the schedule in 2018 include: Belleville, Lincoln (IL), Macon, Springfield & Tri-City
 - Night #2 of the Kokomo Grand Prix at Kokomo Speedway (April 14) was canceled due to weather conditions.
 - Night #2 of Indiana Midget Week at Gas City I-69 Speedway (May 30) was rained out. The track & USAC are working on rescheduling the race.
 - Night #4 of Indiana Midget Week at Bloomington Speedway (June 1) was rained out. 12 of the 28 cars that were entered were able to make a qualifying attempt. The track & USAC are working on a possible reschedule date for this race.
 - USAC added an all new 2 night show at the all new Indianapolis Motor Speedway Dirt Track. The race will be called the BC39 (in honor of the late Bryan Clauson) and will feature the largest purse in Midget Car racing with $15,000 going to the race winner. The race will be held on the Wednesday & Thursday portions of the Brickyard 400 weekend.
 - Night #1 of Pennsylvania Midget Week at Path Valley Speedway Park (August 2) was canceled due to weather conditions.
 - Night #2 of Pennsylvania Midget Week at Linda's Speedway (August 3) was canceled due to weather conditions.

Results and Standings

Races

See also
 2018 USAC AMSOIL National Sprint Car Championship
 2018 USAC Silver Crown Series

References

USAC National Midget Series
United States Auto Club